Sukhwinder singhwas a Janata Dal member of the Legislative Assembly of Uttar Pradesh from December 1989 to April 1991

References 

Uttar Pradesh politicians
Janata Dal politicians